Launchpad is the debut album by Particle.

Track listing
"Launchpad" (7:17)
"Metropolics" (3:39)
"The Elevator" (7:31)
"Below Radar" (5:24)
"The Banker" (6:10)
"Kneeknocker" (8:41)
"Road's a Breeze (@3AM)" (8:10)
"7 Minutes Till Radio Darkness, Part 1" (1:48)
"7 Minutes Till Radio Darkness, Part 2" (2:31)
"Sun Mar 11" (10:39)

Personnel
 Eric Gould - Bass guitar
 Charlie Hitchcock - Guitar
 Steve Molitz - Keyboards
 Darren Pujalet - Drums

Album Reviews
Glide Magazine (March 5, 2004)

References

2004 albums
Particle (band) albums